Cocktail Molotov is a 1980 French drama film written and directed by Diane Kurys. It is her second feature after Peppermint Soda. A female coming of age story set during the spring and summer of 1968, the film is not a sequel but can be considered "companion piece" to its predecessor. It has been called a female take on the male-dominated road movie genre.

Plot 
Seventeen-year-old middle-class Anne (Elise Caron), runs away with her working-class boyfriend Frederic (Philippe Lebas) and his friend Bruno (Francois Cluzet) after a violent fight with her mother. Anne convinces the others to drive to Venice, where she plans to take a ship to Israel in order to join a kibbutz. On the road, Anne grapples with experiences of love, sex, abortion, and "existential wandering". Upon reaching Venice, they learn of the social uprising back in Paris. With their money running out and their car stolen, they hitchhike back to find they have missed the excitement.

Reception 
Cocktail Molotov did not do as well as Peppermint Soda, Kurys' critically acclaimed first feature released three years earlier. Film studies scholar Carrie Tarr has written that audiences may have been confused by Kurys treatment of May '68 as nearly devoid of protest and politics, instead focusing on an explicitly female personal drama, as opposed to the generally male-centered view of the student revolts. She also notes that Kurys had had to rewrite the script due to budget constraints which made reenacting the barricading of Paris streets impossible, and further cut explicitly political scenes out in the editing process to further emphasize the teenagers' story. Perhaps in a reaction to its lack of political content, Vincent Canby's 1981 review in The New York Times called the film "a nearly perfect example of the kind of French film that apotheosizes middle-class values while pretending to question them". While Tarr writes that the film does not depict abortion, love triangles, or the subjectivity of the female central character as well as other films, its autobiographical elements, its pairing of personal narrative with larger, historical events and other connections with the rest of Kurys' filmography mark it as an essential part of her work as auteur.

Cast 
 Elise Caron as Anne
 Philippe Lebas as Frederic
 Francois Cluzet as Bruno
 Genevieve Fontanel as Anne's mother
 Henri Garcin as Anne's Stepfather
 Michel Puterflam as Anne's Father
 Jenny Cleve as Frederic's Mother
 Armando Brancia as Frederic's Father
 Malene Sveinbjornsson as Anne's Little Sister
 Stefania Cassini as Anna-Maria
 Frederique Meininger as Doctor
 Patrick Chesnais as Trucker
 Hélène Vincent as The diplomat's wife

Notes

References 
 
 Foster, Gwendolyn Audrey. Women Film Directors: an International Bio-critical Dictionary. Greenwood Press, Westport, 1995.
 Tarr, Carrie. Diane Kurys. Manchester University Press, New York, 1999.
 Tarr, Carrie.Fifty Contemporary Filmmakers ed. by Yvonne Tasker. Rutledge, New York, 2002.

External links 

1980 films
1980s French-language films
1980 drama films
Films directed by Diane Kurys
French drama films
1980s French films